The 2018–19 Bermudian Premier Division is the 56th season of the Bermudian Premier Division, the top division football competition in Bermuda. The season began on 15 September 2018.

Teams 
Ten teams compete in the league – the top eight teams from the previous season, and two teams promoted from the Bermuda First Division. The new teams this season are BAA Wanderers and Paget Lions, who replace Flanagan's Onions and YMSC Bluebirds.

League table

References

External links
Bermuda Football Association

2018-19
Bermuda
1